Alan Hart (born 21 February 1956) is an English former professional footballer who played in the Football League, as a midfielder.

References

1956 births
Living people
Footballers from Woolwich
English footballers
Association football midfielders
Millwall F.C. players
Charlton Athletic F.C. players
Dulwich Hamlet F.C. players
Ebbsfleet United F.C. players
English Football League players
National League (English football) players